Analı kızlı soup is a soup from Turkey (Malatya, Kahramanmaraş, Gaziantep, Tarsus, Adana) which includes meatballs, tomato, bulgur, and chickpeas. 'Analı kızlı' means, literally, 'with daughters and mothers', daughters being the chickpeas, and mothers the bulgur balls, all in a soup like a yogurt sauce. It is a part of traditional Turkish cuisine.

See also
 List of soups
 Sulu köfte

Notes

External links
 Analı kızlı soup

Turkish soups